Maury Regional Health is a not-for-profit regional health system serving southern Middle Tennessee through its hospitals, clinics, surgery centers, outpatient facilities and physician practice group.

Maury Regional Health is the largest health care provider between Nashville, Tennessee and Huntsville, Alabama, with approximately 3,000 employees throughout the system.

Learn more at MauryRegional.com.

Awards

Maury Regional Medical Center 

● Top Health System–IBM Watson Health (2011, 2012, 2015, 2017, 2018 & 2020)

● 2022 rankings by CareChex®, an information service of Quantros, Inc.

● Top 10% in Tennessee for overall hospital care in the areas of medical excellence and patient safety (2021 CareChex®, an information service of Quantros, Inc.)

● Number one in Tennessee for overall hospital care in the area of medical excellence
(2015, 2016, 2017, 2018, 2019 & 2020 CareChex®, an information service of Quantros, Inc.)

● Baldrige Performance Excellence Program Best Practice Recognition (Leadership – 2016; Strategic Planning & Workforce–2012)

● Leapfrog “A” Hospital Safety Score (16 consecutive reporting periods)

● Recognition for achieving meritorious outcomes for surgical patient care by the American College of Surgeons National Surgical Quality Improvement Program (2020)

● NCDR Chest Pain – MI Registry Gold Performance Achievement Award (2021)

● Beacon Award for Excellence, American Association of Critical-Care Nurses (2019)

● Best for Babies Award - Tennessee Department of Health (2019, 2020)

● U.S. News & World Report High Performing Hospital in 2017-18 for hip and knee replacement

● Top home care agency in nation by HomeCareElite (2006-2017)

● Excellence Award–Tennessee Center for Performance Excellence (2014)

● QUEST: High Performing Hospitals Top Performer (2010, 2011, 2012, 2013 & 2014)

● 100 Top Hospital–Truven Health Analytics (1993, 2008, 2010 & 2013)

● Top Performer on Key Quality Measures–Joint Commission (2013)

● 100 Great Community Hospitals–Becker's Hospital Review (2013)

● 100 Hospitals with Great Orthopedic Programs–Becker's Hospital Review (2013)

● EMS honored with Star of Life Award (2009, 2011 & 2013)

● 50 Top Cardiovascular Hospital (2012)

● Wound Center-Center of Excellence by Healogics (2017)

Marshall Medical Center 

 Top Health System–IBM Watson Health (2011, 2012, 2015, 2017, 2018 & 2020)

Wayne Medical Center 

 Top Health System–IBM Watson Health (2011, 2012, 2015, 2017, 2018 & 2020)
 Top Performer Recognition from The Joint Commission (2015)

Affiliates

Maury Regional Medical Center (Columbia, TN)
Marshall Medical Center (Lewisburg, T))
Wayne Medical Center (Waynesboro, TN)
Maury Regional Medical Group
Lewis Health Center (Hohenwald, TN)
Vanderbilt University Medical Center

References

Hospitals in Tennessee
Buildings and structures in Columbia, Tennessee
1953 establishments in Tennessee
Hospitals established in 1953